Wealden District Council in East Sussex, England is elected every four years. From 2003 until the election in 2019, 55 councillors were elected from 35 wards. From 2019, 45 councillors have been elected from 41 wards.

Political control
Since the first election to the council in 1973 political control of the council has been held by the following parties:

Leadership
The leaders of the council since 2001 have been:

Council elections
Summary of the results of recent council elections, click on the year for full details of each election.

1973 Wealden District Council election
1976 Wealden District Council election
1979 Wealden District Council election
1983 Wealden District Council election (New ward boundaries)
1987 Wealden District Council election

District result maps

By-election results
By-elections occur when seats become vacant between council elections. Below is a summary of recent by-elections; full by-election results can be found by clicking on the by-election name.

References

External links
 Wealden Council

 
Council elections in East Sussex
Wealden